Joni Mäkelä (born 28 September 1993) is a Finnish professional footballer who plays for Florø, as a right winger.

Career

Kokkolan PV
On 24 December 2018, Kokkolan PV announced the signing of Mäkelä on a one-year deal.

References

1997 births
Living people
Finnish footballers
AC Oulu players
FC Santa Claus players
Kotkan Työväen Palloilijat players
FC Haka players
Kuopion Palloseura players
SC Kuopio Futis-98 players
Kokkolan Palloveikot players
Veikkausliiga players
Ykkönen players
Kakkonen players
Association football midfielders
Florø SK players
Norwegian Second Division players
Finnish expatriate footballers
Expatriate footballers in Norway
Finnish expatriate sportspeople in Norway